Wine, Women and Song is a 1933 American drama film directed by Herbert Brenon and starring Lilyan Tashman, Lew Cody and Marjorie Reynolds.

Cast

References

Bibliography
 Donald W. McCaffrey & Christopher P. Jacobs. Guide to the Silent Years of American Cinema. Greenwood Publishing, 1999.

External links

1933 films
1933 drama films
American drama films
Films directed by Herbert Brenon
Monogram Pictures films
American black-and-white films
1930s English-language films
1930s American films